The Obstacle Is the Way: The Timeless Art of Turning Trials into Triumph is the third book by author Ryan Holiday. It was published in 2014. It is a book which offers individuals a framework to flip obstacles into opportunities, an approach crafted by Holiday. It was inspired by the philosophy of stoicism.

Overview 
The title of the book is drawn from a quote from Meditations, a series of personal writings by Roman emperor Marcus Aurelius: “The impediment to action advances action. What stands in the way becomes the way.” Holiday draws from Meditations, Aurelius, and the philosophy of stoicism to expand the central theme of the book, which is that how we respond to obstacles is what defines us. Holiday argues that if an individual learns the framework to flip obstacles into success (as many individuals with different types of successes have done so), he or she create can actually be better for it.

In The Obstacle Is The Way, the framework that Holiday offers is composed of three disciplines: perception, action and will. As he explains this framework, Holiday supplements each section with historical anecdotes and figures from politics, commerce, sports, and history including Theodore Roosevelt, Demosthenes, John D Rockefeller, Amelia Earhart, Laura Ingalls Wilder, Ulysses S. Grant, Barack Obama, Steve Jobs, among others.

Author Holiday explains the purpose by which he wrote the book, writing "If all this book does is make facing and dismantling such stumbling blocks a little easier, it will be enough. But my aim is higher. I want to show you the way to turn every obstacle into an advantage. So this will be a book about ruthless pragmatism and stories from history that illustrate the arts of relentless persistence and indefatigable ingenuity. It teaches you how to get unstuck, unfucked and unleashed. How to turn the many negative situations we encounter in our lives into positive ones – or at least to snatch whatever benefit we can from them. …"

Preface 
In the preface of The Obstacle is the Way,  Holiday begins by setting up the scene in the year of 170 in Germania, as the Roman Emperor Marcus Aurelius wrote down the formula for getting through rough situations. As he sets up the scene, Holiday emphasizes that Aurelius' formula was not a "formula for thriving not just in spite of whatever happens but because of it." In the preface, Holiday sets the tone of the book. He discusses how this book studies how countless individuals took their struggles, flipped them around – using it as a chance to enhance a virtue or skillset. He leaves the preface with a call to action to the reader, asking the reader to join the band of individuals that have challenged themselves to better themselves through the obstacles they've faced and instructing that readers can find the mechanism by which to do this within the book.

Introduction 
 "What blocks us is clear. Systemic: decaying institutions, rising unemployment, skyrocketing costs of education and technological disruption. Individual: too short, too old, too scared... How skilled are we at cataloging what holds us back!".
 Ryan Holiday begins with a story at the beginning of the excerpt of how a king with a kingdom of people who had grown slightly entitled. To change this, the king placed a large boulder in the middle of the main road, blocking entry to the city. He watched as many of the kingdom's people would try and go on the road. Most of the people ended up either looking at it and leaving or put in minimal effort before eventually giving up. After a few days, a peasant (not from the wealthy kingdom) came to the town. Like the citizens of the town, he first tried to move the rock out the way. After realizing the boulder was too massive, he then went into the forest, grabbed a branch which he transformed into a lever, which then was able to move the rock which was stuck in the road. After the peasant dislodged the rock, he discovered that underneath was a purse of gold coins and a note from the King which said "The Obstacle in the Path becomes the path. Never forget, within every obstacle is an opportunity to improve our condition." Through this anecdote, Holiday emphasizes the message that obstacles, if handed properly, can leave us in better shape then if we had never encountered them at all.
 "All great victories, be they in business, politics, art or seduction, involved resolving problems with a potent cocktail of creativity, focus and daring. When you have a goal, obstacles are actually teaching you how to get where you want to go – carving you a path. "The things which hurt," – Benjamin Franklin wrote 'instruct''"

Part 1: Perception

The Discipline of Perception 
 In this part of the book, Holiday argues the point that an individual's perspective impacts his or her success. Holiday takes on the Stoic point of view by stating that an objective mind, which can "resist temptation or excitement, no matter how seductive, no matter the situation " can succeed. One example he mentions is of Rockefeller, who stayed grounded by understanding the turbulence of the market and only investing when he deemed it was fit, no matter how excited the individuals around him were. This type of stillness allowed his business to flourish throughout multiple economic crisis that would affect him during the time.
 Key Point: Success is the product of perception of our environment.
 Key Point: Holiday argues the impact of the physical evolutionary mind in the advanced world we live in is a result of our primal mechanisms messing us over. Holiday argues that we can combat the primal responses that cause us to act irrationally by cultivating discipline in perception. He argues "Discipline in perception lets you clearly see the disadvantage and proper course of action in every situation – without the pestilence of panic or fear

Recognize Your Power 
 "We decide what we will make of each and every situation. We decide whether we will break or whether we'll resist. We decide whether we'll ascent or reject. No one can force us to give up or to believe something that is untrue... Our perceptions are the thing we're in complete control of."

Steady your Nerves 
In this section, Holiday explains how when individuals set out to make a difference or set goals for themselves, the risk of being met by unexpected challenges is always there. Holiday emphasizes  two major skills to have during these challenging times: grace and poise. Holiday explains that when stress comes, it triggers the human, primal, senseless reactions. Grace and poise allow individuals to keep a cool head and then encourage the  individual to "deploy other skills" which can help solve the problem. He offers the reader a tip, encouraging the reader to "steady their nerves."

Control your Emotions 
 Cultivate the skill to remain calm so the energy that would feed negativity is used on being solution-focused and fixing problems rather than reacting to them.
 Holiday includes the quote from the Gift of Fear, where the author Gavin de Becker writes, "When you worry, ask yourself 'What am I choosing to not see right now?' What important things are you missing because you chose worry over introspection, alertness or wisdom?" 
 The key point Holiday emphasizes here is that unhelpful emotions can be deconstructed using logic which helps us figure out root causes and helps keep us grounded

Practice Objectivity 
 Animalistic brains think: perceive and then act.
 Holiday encourages the reader to stop being so judgmental and take on life with an objective lense. He gives the example on how we can offer such great advice to our friends because we are able to analyze the situation without personal baggage. By being more objective, we take on less of a victim mindset and can deal with the situation more powerfully and steadily.

Alter Your Perspective 
 "Fear is debilitating, distracting, tiring and often irrational... The task, as Pericles showed, is not to ignore fear, but to explain it away. Take what you're afraid of – when fear strikes you – and break it apart."
 "Remember: We choose how we'll look at things. We retain the ability to inject perspective into a situation. We can't change the obstacles themselves – that part of the equation is set – but the power of perspective can change how the obstacles appear. How we approach, view, and contextualize an obstacle, and what we tell ourselves it means, determines how daunting and trying it will be to overcome."
 "Is our perspective truly giving us perspective or is it what's actually causing the problem?" … What we can do is limit and expand our perspective to whatever will keep us calmest and most ready for the task at hand."
 Holiday divides perspective into two definitions: context and framing.

 Context: how individuals see the specific situation or obstacle amidst the world, their lives and a bigger picture
 Framing: how individuals personally evaluate and make sense of the situations they are presented with

Is it up to you? 
 Holiday uses the story of Tommy John to describe how the ability to discern between outcomes and situations under our control allows us to put focused energy into those matters, and then be successful.
 Holiday lists things that are under an individuals control which include: emotions, judgements, creativity, attitude, perspective, desires, decisions and determination.
 "Focusing exclusively on what is in our power magnifies and enhances our power. But every ounce of energy directed at things we can't actually influence is wasted – self-indulgent and self-destructive. So much power – ours, and other people's is frittered away at this manner. To see an obstacle as a challenge, to make the best of it anyway, that is also a choice – a choice that is up to us."

Live in the Present Moment 
 Holiday begins the chapter by providing a list of businesses that began amidst economic depressions. He argues that the individuals who founded the businesses were able to succeed because they weren't focused on the situation or context at which they were starting their business, but rather the products that they were trying to sell and had strong faith in.
 "Yet in our own lives, we aren't content to deal with things as they happen. We have to dive endlessly into what everything "means", whether something is "fair" or not, whats "behind" this or that, and what everyone else is doing. Then we wonder why we don't actually have the energy to deal with our problems. Or we get ourselves so worked up and intimidated because of the overthinking, that if'd we just gotten to work, we'd probably be done already."
 Holiday encourages the reader not to get caught up in thinking about the entire situation, wishing a situation would be another type of way, but rather being mindful and in the moment.
 Holiday also emphasizes to the reader that it takes active work to be mindful and in the moment. He writes, "One thing is certain. Its simply not a matter of saying: Oh, I'll live in the present. You have to work at it. Catch your mind when it wonders – don't let it get away from you. Discard distracting thoughts. Leave things well enough alone  – no matter how much you feel like doing otherwise."

Think Differently 
 In this chapter, Holiday uses the example of Steve Jobs to drive home the idea that our perception of our capabilities shapes what we end up accomplishing. He argues that individuals must believe in themselves and their capabilities, especially when trying to reach big goals.

Finding the Opportunity 
 Blitzkrieg Example:
 "Its one thing to not be overwhelmed by obstacles, or discouraged or upset by them. This is something a few are able to do. But after you have controlled your emotions, and you can see objectively and stand steadily, the next step becomes possible: a mental flip, so you're not looking at the obstacle but the opportunity within it."
 "Its our preconceptions that are the problem. They tell us that things should or need to be a certain way, so when they're not, we naturally assume that we are at a disadvantage or that we'd be wasting our time trying to pursue an alternative course. When really, it's all fair game, and every situation is an opportunity for us to act."
 "The struggle against an obstacle inevitably propels the fighter to a new level of functioning. The extent of the struggle determines the extent of the growth. The obstacle is an advantage, not an adversity. The enemy is any perception that prevents us from seeing this."

Prepare to Act 
 Holiday talks about how transformative it is to be able to understand that the worst thing to occur is for us to be faced with an obstacle and lose our composure. He argues that by not remaining mentally composed, we make the problem larger and heavier upon ourselves.
 "The demand on you is this: Once you see the world as it is, you must act. The proper perception – objective, rational, ambitious, clean – isolates the obstacle and exposes it for what it is. A clearer head makes for steadier hands. And then those hands must be put to work. Good use."
 "But boldness is acting anyway, even though you understand the negative and reality of the obstacle. Decide to tackle what stands in your way – not because you're a gambler defying the odds but because you've calculated them and boldly embraced the risk."

Part II

Preface 
 In the preface of part II, Holiday discusses how individuals need to take action that is intentional and not just aimless. He discusses the value of action, specifically, "directed action" and writes that action is able to "dismantle the obstacles in front of us." Holiday also writes that action needs to be taken with "creative application and not brute force".
 "Our movements and decisions define us: We must be sure to act with deliberation, boldness, and persistence. Those are the attributes of right and effective action. Nothing else – not thinking or evasion or aid from others. Action is the solution and cure to our predicaments."

The Discipline of Action 
 "We forget: In life it doesn't matter what happens to you or where you came from. It only matters what you do with what you've been given. And the only way you'll do something spectacular is by using it all to your advantage."

Get Moving 
 Holiday begins this chapter by discussing how Amelia Earhart, the first pilot was given the opportunity to fly a plane. He focuses on the fact that when Earhart was offered this, it wasn't presented exactly as the opportunity but rather she was told that she was second choice (the first choice had backed out), and that while the men that were on the flight with her would receive compensation, Earhart would not receive anything. Holiday doesn't use this example to encourage individuals to settle, but rather he argues that individuals with firm  faith in themselves jump at the opportunity to start more than anything. This was an opportunity for Earhart to fly a plane and thus she took it.
 Holiday argues in this chapter that many times we wait for the conditions to be the way we want them and for the situation to go our way before we act. 
 "Life can be frustrating. Oftentimes we know what our problems are. We may even know what to do about them. But we fear taking action is too risky, that we don't have the experience, or that it's not how we pictured it, or because it's too expensive, because its too soon, because we think something better might come along, because it might not work. And you know what happens as a result of it? Nothing. We do nothing." 
 He argues that we complain about not taking opportunities but really we sometimes sit idle and pass them up.
 "For some reason, these days we tend to downplay the importance of aggression, of taking risks, of barreling forward." 
 "Like Earhart, Rommel knew that those who attack problems and life with the most initiative and energy usually win." 
 "We talk a lot about courage in society but we forget that at its most basic level it's really just taking action – whether that's approaching someone you're intimidated by or deciding to finally crack a book open on a subject you need to learn. Just as Earhart did, and all the greats you admire started by saying Yes, lets go. And they usually did it in less desirable circumstances than we'll ever suffer." 
 "Just because the conditions aren't exactly to your liking, or you don't feel ready yet, doesn't mean you'll get a pass. If you want momentum, you'll have to create it yourself, right now, by getting up and getting started."

Practice Persistence 
 "If we're to overcome our obstacles, this is the message to broadcast – internally and externally. We will not be stopped by failure, we will not be rushed or distracted by external noise. We will chisel and peg away at the obstacle until it is gone. Resistance is futile." 
 "In persistence, he'd not only broken through: In trying all the wrong ways, Grant discovered a totally new way – the way that would eventually win the war."
 He writes how Thomas Edison was not the only person experimenting with incandescent lights during his time (like we imagine.) But he was the only man willing to test six thousand different filaments to get closer to his ultimate  goal. Holiday writes how his example was able to proof that "genius often really is just persistence in disguise."
 "In applying the entirety of his physical and mental energy – in never growing weary or giving up – Edison had outlasted impatient competitors, investors and the press to discover, in a piece of bamboo, of all things, the power to illuminate the world." 
 "Working at it works. It's that simple. (But again, not easy.)" 
 "For most of what we attempt in life, chops are not the issue. We're usually skilled and knowledgeable and capable enough. But do we have the patience to refine our idea? The energy to beat on enough doors until we find investors or supporters? The persistence to slog through the politics and drama of working with a group?" 
 "When people ask where we are, what we're doing, how that "situation" is coming along, the answer should be clear: We're working on it. We're getting closer. When setbacks come, we respond by working twice as hard."

Iterate 
 Holiday begins the chapter by discussing how in Silicon Valley the start-ups don't release a finalized product but rather a "minimum viable product" which is basically a super basic, root product of the actual product that they would like to produce. Holiday responds that the reason behind this method is to see the consumer demand and response and avoid launching a product that is unwanted by consumers. In this way the engineers at Silicon Valley actually are able to use failure of the product as something that provides them with insights on their products.
 Holiday then follows the example that he provides of the business with the note about failure. He writes, "Failure really can be an asset if what you're trying to do is improve, learn or do something new. It's the preceding feature of nearly all successes. There's nothing shameful about being wrong, about changing course. Each time it happens we have new options. Problems become opportunities." 
 "When failure does come, ask: What went wrong here? What can be improved? What am I missing? This helps birth alternative ways of doing what needs to be done, ways that are often much better than we started with. Failure puts you in corners you have to think your way out. It is a source of breakthroughs."
 "People fail in small ways all the time. but they don't learn. They don't listen. They don't see the problems that failure exposes. It doesn't make them better... It's time you understand that the world is telling you something with each and every failure and action. It's feedback – giving you precise instructions on how to improve, it's trying to wake you up from your cluelessness. It's trying to teach you something. Listen."

Follow the Process 
 In this chapter, Holiday discusses how the process is about making tasks manageable and looking at the big picture. Instead of focusing too heavily on the overall goal we should focus on the task in front of us.
 "We needn't to scramble like we're so often inclined to do when some difficult  task sits in front of us. Remember the first time you saw a complicated algebrae equation. It was a jumble of symbols and unknowns. But then you stopped, took a deep breath, ,and broke it down. You isolated the variables, solved for them and all that was left was the answer. Do that now, for whatever obstacles you come across. We can take a breath, do the immediate, composite part in front of us – and follow its thread into the next action. Everything in order, everything connected." 
 "Being trapped is just a position, not a fate. You get out of it by addressing and eliminating each part of that position through small, deliberate actions  –not by trying (and failing) to push it away with superhuman strength."
 "How often do we compromise or settle because we feel that the real solution is too ambitious or outside our grasp? How often do we assume that change is impossible because it's too big? Involves too many groups?

Do Your Job, Do It Right 
 "Everything we do matters – whether it's making smoothies while you save up money or studying for the bar – even after you already achieved the success you sought. Everything is a chance to do and be your best."
 "We will be and do many things in our lives. Some are prestigious, some are onerous, none are beneath. To whatever we face, our job is to respond with: hard work, honesty and helping other as best we can." 
 "In every situation, life is asking us a question, and our actions are the answer. Our job is simply to answer well. Right action – unselfish, dedicated, masterful, creative – that is the answer to that question. That's one way to find the meaning of life. And how to turn every obstacle into an opportunity."

Reception 
The book has sold over 100,000 copies since its release and been translated into 17 languages. After the book's release, the book slowly made its way through the community of professional sports, and are being read by a number of prominent athletes and head coaches including Joe Maddon of the Chicago Cubs, Marquette basketball coach Shaka Smart, tennis pro James McGee, NFL lineman Garrett Gilkey, Olympic gold medalist Chandra Crawford, and others. On the way to their 2014 Super Bowl victory, Michael Lombardi and Bill Belichick of the New England Patriots distributed copies of The Obstacle Is the Way to their staff and players. In the  2015 season, Seattle Seahawks GM John Schneider and Pete Carroll passed the book around the team's locker room.

References

External links
 TEDxUofChicago 'Stoic Optimism' by Ryan Holiday
 Stephen McGinty: Romans to the rescue The Scotsman June 2014

2014 non-fiction books
American non-fiction books
Contemporary philosophical literature
Philosophy books
Stoicism
Portfolio (publisher) books
Profile Books books